6th Politburo may refer to:
6th Politburo of the Chinese Communist Party
6th Politburo of the Communist Party of Cuba
Politburo of the 6th Congress of the Russian Social Democratic Labour Party (Bolsheviks)
6th Politburo of the Party of Labour of Albania
6th Politburo of the Communist Party of Czechoslovakia
6th Politburo of the Socialist Unity Party of Germany
6th Politburo of the Polish United Workers' Party
6th Politburo of the Romanian Communist Party
6th Politburo of the Lao People's Revolutionary Party
6th Politburo of the Communist Party of Vietnam
6th Politburo of the League of Communists of Yugoslavia
6th Politburo of the Hungarian Working People's Party
6th Politburo of the Workers' Party of Korea